James A. Donohoe (August 9, 1877 – February 26, 1956) was a United States district judge of the United States District Court for the District of Nebraska.

Education and career

Born in O'Neill, Nebraska, Donohoe received a Bachelor of Science degree from Freemont Normal College (now Midland University) in Nebraska in 1898 and read law to enter the bar in 1905. He was in private practice in Nebraska from 1905 to 1933. He was a member of the Nebraska Senate (now the sole house of the Nebraska Legislature) from 1908 to 1909.

Federal judicial service

On April 15, 1933, Donohoe was nominated by President Franklin D. Roosevelt to a seat on the United States District Court for the District of Nebraska vacated by Judge Joseph William Woodrough. Donohoe was confirmed by the United States Senate on April 20, 1933, and received his commission on April 27, 1933. He served as Chief Judge from 1948 until his death on February 26, 1956.

References

Sources
 

1877 births
1956 deaths
Nebraska state senators
Judges of the United States District Court for the District of Nebraska
United States district court judges appointed by Franklin D. Roosevelt
20th-century American judges
United States federal judges admitted to the practice of law by reading law
People from O'Neill, Nebraska